The dusky babbler (Turdoides tenebrosa) is a species of bird in the family Leiothrichidae.
It is found in Democratic Republic of the Congo, Ethiopia, Sudan, and Uganda.
Its natural habitat is subtropical or tropical moist shrubland.

References

Collar, N. J. & Robson, C. 2007. Family Timaliidae (Babblers)  pp. 70 – 291 in; del Hoyo, J., Elliott, A. & Christie, D.A. eds. Handbook of the Birds of the World, Vol. 12. Picathartes to Tits and Chickadees. Lynx Edicions, Barcelona.

dusky babbler
Birds of Sub-Saharan Africa
dusky babbler
Taxonomy articles created by Polbot